{{DISPLAYTITLE:C10H13NO3}}
The molecular formula C10H13NO3 (molar mass : 195.22 g/mol) may refer to:

 AMPT
 Benzodioxolylhydroxybutanamine
 Damascenine
 Methoxymethylenedioxyphenethylamine
 Methylenedioxyhydroxyamphetamine
 Metirosine